AutoGyro GmbH is a German aircraft manufacturer based in Hildesheim. The company specializes in the design and manufacture of autogyros in the form of fully assembled, ready to fly aircraft.

The company has had commercial success with their designs, which include a mast-mounted vibration dampening system. The enclosed cabin AutoGyro Cavalon and AutoGyro Calidus are noted for their very aerodynamically clean fuselage fairings. The open cockpit AutoGyro MT-03 is described as a "market leader" and is sold in the UK as the modified RotorSport UK MT-03. The AutoGyro MTOsport is a development version of the MT-03. British importer RotorSport UK also markets a modified version of the Calidus as the RotorSport UK Calidus. , they build around 300 aircraft per year.

In 2013 the company produced the world's first electric aircraft autogyro, the eCavalon

Aircraft

References

External links

Aircraft manufacturers of Germany
Companies based in Lower Saxony
Economy of Hildesheim
Autogyros